Griffith-Merrillville Airport  is a public-use airport two miles east of Griffith, in Lake County, Indiana, United States. It is privately owned by Griffith Aviation, Inc.

Facilities
Its runway, 8/26, is 4,900 by 75 feet (1,494 x 23 m) asphalt. The runway has VOR/DME, GPS Instrument Approaches and Pilot Controlled Lighting.

Airport services include a fixed-base operator (FBO) and flight school from Griffith Aviation, full service maintenance from Great Northern and custom engine overhauls  from G & N Aircraft. Both 100LL gas and Jet A fuel are available.

In the year ending August 23, 2006 the airport had 33,699 aircraft operations, average 92 per day: 99% general aviation and 1% air taxi. In 2015, 71 aircraft were based at the airport: 48 single-engine, 15 multi-engine, 1 jet and 7 helicopters.

References

External links 
 Griffith-Merrillville Airport, official site
 Aerial photo from Indiana Department of Transportation
 Aerial photo as of 12 April 1998 from USGS The National Map
 
 

Airports in Lake County, Indiana
Northwest Indiana
1962 establishments in Indiana
Airports established in 1962